Viola Jelagat Kibiwot (born 22 December 1983 in Keiyo District) is a runner from Kenya who specialises in the 1500 metres.

Kibiwot won her first international medal as a junior runner at the 2000 IAAF World Cross Country Championships, where she took the bronze medal for Kenya. Consecutive world junior cross country titles followed at the 2001 and 2002 editions of the event, and she also claimed the gold medal over 1500 m at the 2002 World Junior Championships in Athletics.

After becoming a senior runner, she struggled to match her junior success. She was outside of the top twenty in the senior short race at the 2003 IAAF World Cross Country Championships, and again at the 2005 race. She was seventh on the track at the 2006 Commonwealth Games, but appeared to make her breakthrough over 1500 m at the 2007 World Championships in Athletics with a fifth-place finish in a personal best time of 4:02.10 minutes in the final. She narrowly missed out on a medal at the 2007 IAAF World Athletics Final, coming fourth.

She competed at the 2008 Summer Olympics, but failed to build upon her progress on the global stage and did not advance beyond heats. At the 2009 World Championships she did not get past semi-finals stage. Kibiwoot ran on the 2010 IAAF Diamond League circuit, but never made the top three in the event. She came seventh in the 1500 m at the 2010 Commonwealth Games in Delhi. Kibiwot won her first senior continental medal at the 2011 African Cross Country Championships, taking the silver medal behind Mercy Cherono and helping Kenya to the team title.

She was eliminated in the semi-finals of the 1500 m at the 2011 World Championships in Athletics. She changed her focus to longer distances as a result and performed better on the world stage, taking sixth at the 2012 Olympic 5000 m final and fourth at the 2013 World Championships 5000 m final. At the 2013 World Cross Country Championships she helped Kenya to the team title with her seventh-place finish. An outing over four miles on the roads in October 2013 saw her run the world best for the distance, as she completed the 4 mijl van Groningen race in 19:20 minutes.

Achievements

Personal bests 
 1500 metres - 4:02.10 min (2007)
 3000 metres - 8:40.14 min (2003)
 Two miles -  9:12.59 (2014)
 5000 metres - 14:33.48 min (2013)

References

External links 
 
Global Sports Communication profile

1983 births
Living people
People from Elgeyo-Marakwet County
Kenyan female middle-distance runners
Kenyan female long-distance runners
Athletes (track and field) at the 2008 Summer Olympics
Athletes (track and field) at the 2012 Summer Olympics
Olympic athletes of Kenya
Athletes (track and field) at the 2006 Commonwealth Games
Athletes (track and field) at the 2010 Commonwealth Games
World Athletics Championships athletes for Kenya
Kenyan female cross country runners
Commonwealth Games competitors for Kenya